Arera Colony is one of the largest residential areas and localities in Bhopal, Madhya Pradesh. Interspersed with plantations, trees and gardens, it is a posh area of the city and occupies a large area of the middle and southern part of the city. The locality is further divided into 8 Sectors, E-1 to E-8.

Etymology
Arera Club derives its name from Arera Hills which dominate the landscape of the city. The club has badminton, a gymnasium, and tennis facilities. A bar and restaurant add to its leisurely existence. Its members, though, are bureaucrats of Madhya Pradesh Government; it has been a highly inclusive social gathering. The Chief Secretary of Madhya Pradesh, Shri Avani Vaish has passionately nurtured Arera club in last 5 years.

Points of interest

Shopping

Main shopping areas and markets in the area are Manisha Market, Bittan Market, 1100 Quarters, 7 no., 8 no., 10 no., 11 no, 12 no., 19 no., Savoy Complex, Rohit Nagar and Dana Pani. Metro Plaza at Bittan Market is one of the largest shopping complexes in the area. Various malls and complexes are also under construction, like Aura Mall, Aakriti Business Center (Both in E-8) Rajkishor kirana etc.

Hotels and restaurants

The Bittan Market in E-5 and the 10 no. Market, which is located in E-4, have a lot of good eating spots as well as shops, showrooms and shopping complexes. In addition, various eateries, hotels and restaurants are there in the colony. Some of them are
 KFC at 10 No.
 Manohar Sweets
 Blue Heaven Cakes & Flowers
 Amer Bakery Hut
 E-Square Restaurant
 Bake n' Shake
 Brijwasi Sweets
 Cafe Coffee Day 
Cowboy Restaurant 
Cremeore Ice Cream
 Chhappan Bhog
 Dana Pani
 Evening Point
 Hakeem Hotel
 Sagar Gaire Fast Food
 Dominos
 Paratha house, E-7 ashoka society
 Cafe Mojo Jojo
Rainbow Treat 
Starbucks Coffee

Schools

A large number of private and government schools are present in the colony. Some of them are listed below. 
 St. Joseph's Co-Ed School, Bhopal
 Arera Convent High Secondary School.E-6,Arera colony
 Bhopal Public School
 Campion School Bhopal
 Orion School
 MVM Senior School
 Nalanda Public School
 Scholar's Home Public School
 World Way School
 Study Hall Nursery School
Einstein Public School

Hospitals

Several private and government hospitals, nursing homes and clinics are located here. Some of them are

 Agrawal Hospital
 ASG Eye Hospital
 Asian Globus Hospital
 National Hospital
 Narmada Hospital
 Dewani Hospital
 Malti Hospital
 Sujyoti Hospital
 Asha Niketan Hospital
 Bansal Hospital 
Shekhar Hospital
 Anushree Hospital
 Bhopal Fracture Hospital
Pushpanjali Hospital 
1100 Quarters Hospital

Other Places 
The locality also has petrol pumps and ATMs facilities
Indian Oil Petrol Pump 
SBI 
ICICI Bank 
Axis Bank 
Bharat Petroleum 
Essar Petrol Pump 
Central Bank of India 
HP Petrol Pump

Sports

The Arjun Fitness Club, at Bittan Market houses swimming, squash, gym and other sports facilities. Besides, Arera Colony is dotted by a large no. of playgrounds. The Arera Cricket Club, is located at the Old Campion Ground near 10 no. Market. The ground also annually hosts Mayank Chaturvedi Smriti Cricket Tournament, which attracts a lot of teams from all over the country. There is also a Bhojpur club which is very high profile and has good service.

Health club

Your Fitness Club - provides a comfortable Gym And Best equipments in various cities

Getting there and orientation

Getting to this locality is very easy. One can hire a taxi, mini bus, auto rickshaw or a metro taxi from anywhere in the city to reach there.  

Neighbourhoods in Bhopal